ESP-Disk is a New York-based record company and label founded in 1963 by lawyer Bernard Stollman.

History
Though it originally existed to release Esperanto-based music, beginning with its second release (Albert Ayler's Spiritual Unity), ESP became the most important exponent of what is commonly referred to as free jazz. Early releases included albums by Paul Bley, Pharoah Sanders and Sun Ra. ESP also released recordings by uncommercial underground rock acts including the Fugs, The Godz and Pearls Before Swine. The label's motto is "The artists alone decide what you will hear."

Bernard Stollman faced allegations of not paying royalties to the artists that were signed to ESP-Disk. Tom Rapp of the band Pearls Before Swine claimed that: "We never got any money from ESP. Never, not even like a hundred dollars or something. My real sense is that he [Stollman] was abducted by aliens, and when he was probed it erased his memory of where all the money was". Peter Stampfel of the band Holy Modal Rounders and The Fugs claimed that Stollman told him that "the contract says that all rights belong to me. You have no royalties ever, ever, ever. The publishing is mine. You don't own the songs anymore. We don't owe you anything". Members of The Fugs have also stated claims that they received an unfavourable record contract. Ed Sanders said that "our royalty rate was less than 3%, one of the lower percentages in the history of western civilization". 801 Magazine, which featured an interview with Stollman in 2008, said that Stollman claimed that "he paid all the recording costs and gave the musicians small advances", and that "he never made any money from the music".

Discography

See also
 BYG Actuel
 AACM
 List of record labels

References

External links
 Official site
 Official Myspace
 Collectors' discography
 The Old New Thing is Newer Than Ever. Liner notes for an ESP-Disk mash-up by Wu Ming 1
 an esp-disk' discography at Wesleyan University

Alternative rock record labels
American record labels
Experimental music record labels
Jazz record labels
Record labels established in 1964